Neos Panteleimonas is a settlement of the former municipality of East Olympos, which is part of the municipality of Dio-Olympos, in the Pieria regional unit, Central Macedonia, Greece.

Neos Panteleimonas is a settlement built on the foothills of Mount Olympos by the seaside. Its privileged region offers endless view to the sea and the Castle of Platamon. By car, the Old Panteleimon is 400 km from Athens and 110 km from Thessaloniki.
It is worth visiting the museum and the archeological site of Dion.

Nearest places
Palios Panteleimonas
Beach of Panteleimon
Platamon
Neoi Poroi

See also
Castle of Platamon

References
Νέος Παντελήμονας

Archaeological sites in Greece
Populated places in Pieria (regional unit)